Unione Fiduciaria S.p.A. – Società Fiduciaria e di Servizi delle Banche Popolari Italiane  (literally Fiduciary Union) is an Italian bank that specialized in fiduciary. The bank was formed by 8 People's Bank of Italy in 1958.

On 30 April 2015 UBI Banca sold the business in UBI Fiduciaria to Unione Fiduciaria. In 2016 Unione Fiduciaria acquired Istifid, which was owned by Banco di Desio e della Brianza, Credito Valtellinese, Canova Investissements, Allianz Bank Financial Advisors S.p.A., Banco Azzoaglio and others. After the deal Credito Valtellinese and Banco Desio increased their stakes in Unione Fiduciaria. Istifid acquired Aperta Fiduciaria, a wholly owned subsidiary of Credito Valtellinese in 2013.

Shareholders
In April 2013 UBI Banca sold all the stake (10.501%) they hold for €3.4 million.

 Banca Popolare dell'Emilia Romagna (24%)
 Banca Popolare di Sondrio (24%)
 DepoBank (24%)
 Banca Popolare di Puglia e Basilicata (0.79%)
 Banca Popolare di Cortona (0.0185%)
 other shareholders
 Banca Agricola Popolare di Ragusa
 Banca Valsabbina
 Banca di Credito Popolare di Torre del Greco
 Banca Popolare di Bari
 Banca Popolare del Cassinate
 Banca Popolare di Cividale
 UBI Banca
 Banca Popolare di Fondi
 Banca Popolare di Lajatico
 Banca Popolare del Lazio
 Banco BPM
 Banca Popolare Pugliese
 Banca Popolare Sant'Angelo
 Banca Popolare Valconca
 Banca di Piacenza
 Credito Valtellinese
 SanFelice 1893 Banca Popolare
 Südtiroler Volksbank (plus ex-Banca Popolare di Marostica)

See also

 Istituto Centrale delle Banche Popolari Italiane
 Associazione Nazionale fra le Banche Popolari

References

External links
 

Banks established in 1958
Italian companies established in 1958
Banks of Italy
Companies based in Milan
BPER Banca